Kwirarire is a village in the Commune of Rugazi in Bubanza Province in western Burundi.

References

External links
Satellite map at Maplandia.com

Populated places in Burundi
Bubanza Province